ISO 3166-2:BA is the entry for Bosnia and Herzegovina in ISO 3166-2, part of the ISO 3166 standard published by the International Organization for Standardization (ISO), which defines codes for the names of the principal subdivisions (e.g., provinces or states) of all countries coded in ISO 3166-1.

Currently for Bosnia and Herzegovina, ISO 3166-2 codes are defined for 2 entities and 1 district with special status. The Brčko District has special status, formally belonging to both entities but effectively self-governing.

Each code consists of two parts, separated by a hyphen. The second part is three letters.

Current codes
Subdivision names are listed as in the ISO 3166-2 standard published by the ISO 3166 Maintenance Agency (ISO 3166/MA).

ISO 639-1 codes are used to represent subdivision names in the following administrative languages:
 (bs): Bosnian
 (hr): Croatian
 (sr): Serbian using UN III/11 1977 romanization

Click on the button in the header to sort each column.

Notes

Changes
The following changes to the entry have been announced in newsletters by the ISO 3166/MA since the first publication of ISO 3166-2 in 1998. ISO stopped issuing newsletters in 2013.

The following changes to the entry are listed on ISO's online catalogue, the Online Browsing Platform:

Canton codes 

Codes for the ten cantons of the Federation of Bosnia and Herzegovina were included until 27 November 2015.

See also
 Subdivisions of Bosnia and Herzegovina
 FIPS region codes of Bosnia and Herzegovina

References

External links
 ISO Online Browsing Platform: BA
 Divisions of Bosnia and Herzegovina, Statoids.com

2:BA
ISO 3166-2
ISO 3166-2
Bosnia and Herzegovina geography-related lists